Austroparmelina is a genus of foliose lichens in the large family Parmeliaceae. It contains species formerly placed in the genera Parmelina and Canoparmelia. All species of Austroparmelina have an Australasian-South African distribution.

Description
Austroparmelina species have a grey, foliose thallus comprising somewhat linear to irregular lobes, and featuring short, simple rhizines. Their relatively large ascospores measure 9–18 by 4–8 μm and have a thick perispore. The predominant secondary chemicals present in the genus are orcinol depsides such as lecanoric acid and gyrophoric acid.

Species
Austroparmelina chlorolecanorica (Elix) A.Crespo, Divakar & Elix (2010)
Austroparmelina conlabrosa (Hale) A.Crespo, Divakar & Elix (2010)
Austroparmelina elixii (Argüello & A.Crespo) A.Crespo, Divakar & Elix (2010)
Austroparmelina endoleuca (Taylor) A.Crespo, Divakar & Elix (2010)
Austroparmelina euplectina (Kurok. ex Elix) A.Crespo, Divakar & Elix (2010)
Austroparmelina johnstoniae (Elix) A.Crespo, Divakar & Elix (2010)
Austroparmelina labrosa (Zahlbr.) A.Crespo, Divakar & Elix (2010)
Austroparmelina macrospora (Elix & J.Johnst.) A.Crespo, Divakar & Elix (2010)
Austroparmelina norpruinata (Elix & J.Johnst.) A.Crespo, Divakar & Elix (2010)
Austroparmelina pallida (Elix & Kantvilas) Kantvilas & Divakar (2013)
Austroparmelina pruinata (Müll. Arg.) A.Crespo, Divakar & Elix (2010)
Austroparmelina pseudorelicina (Jatta) A.Crespo, Divakar & Elix (2010)
Austroparmelina subarida (Elix) A.Crespo, Divakar & Elix (2010)
Austroparmelina subtiliacea (Nyl.) A.Crespo, Divakar & Elix (2010)
Austroparmelina whinrayi (Elix) Kantvilas & Divakar (2013)

References

Parmeliaceae
Lichen genera
Lecanorales genera
Taxa described in 2010
Taxa named by John Alan Elix
Taxa named by Ana Crespo
Taxa named by Pradeep Kumar Divakar